Playa Vicente is a municipality  located in the south zone of the State of Veracruz, about 220 km from state capital Xalapa. It has a surface of 2,122.14 km2.

Geographic Limits

The municipality of Playa Vicente is delimited to the north by José Azueta and Isla, to the east by Juan Rodríguez Clara and to the south and west by Oaxaca State.  Playa Vicente is watered by the rivers La Lana and Playa Vicente.

The Playa Vicente people has very ancient origins, it was in its surrounding areas in Huaspala's settlement, Acuezpal's important city existed  tepec.  For Decree of January 14, 1930, the Playa Vicente people rises up to category of Villa, with Venustiano Carranza's denomination; in 1937 for Decree of December 14 Vicente returns the beach denomination.

Agriculture

It produces principally maize, beans, orange fruit, coffee and mango.

Celebrations

In  Playa Vicente , in February takes place the celebration in honor to Virgen de la Candelaria, Patron of the town, and in December takes place the celebration in honor to Virgen de Guadalupe.

Weather

The weather in  Playa Vicente  is warm  and wet all year with rains in summer and autumn.

References

External links 

  Municipal Official webpage
  Municipal Official Information

Municipalities of Veracruz